() is a video game character and the main antagonist of the original Mega Man series, as well as Mega Man's archenemy and is also the creator of Bass and Zero. He appeared in the first Mega Man video game and later in promotions and other media related to the series. In Japanese, he is voiced by Takeshi Aono in all appearances except Mega Man: The Power Battle and its sequel, as well as Mega Man: Upon a Star, where he instead was voiced by Kenichi Ogata; in English, the character is voiced by Douglas Kendall, Dean Galloway, Keith Silverstein, Ian James Corlett, and Scott McNeil voicing the character in Mega Man 8, Mega Man Powered Up, Mega Man 11, Captain N: The Game Master, and the animated series, respectively.

Scott McNeil also reprised his role in Mega Man: Upon a Star, and Puzzle Fighter, being the only English voice actor to voice Dr. Wily more than once. Paul Dobson voiced the character in MegaMan NT Warrior.

Conception and design

Artist and producer Keiji Inafune explained that Wily's design is inspired by Albert Einstein, and was initially conceived to appear as a tall, thin scientist with a mustache, glasses, balding hair, and lab coat. As a plus, his first name is Albert. As development on Mega Man progressed, Inafune redrew the character to match the in-game sprites, making him shorter and removing the glasses from his original design. Inafune has expressed disdain for this design, stating in a 2003 interview that if an artist approached him with similar work, he would reject it and demand better. With the production of Mega Man 2, Inafune decided to redraw the character completely, aiming to tie into the common perception of a mad scientist. To this end he made Wily slightly taller, and elongated his hair and chin. Satisfied with the alternations, Inafune kept the design consistent for later appearances of the character.

Appearances

In video games 
Introduced in the first Mega Man game, Wily was an old friend of Dr. Light, whose achievements in designing several advanced robots (including intelligent humanlike robots) overshadowed Wily's own accomplishments. Jealous, he reprogrammed the robots for combat, seeking to use them as weapons to assist him in taking over the world, with the exception of the childlike robots Rock and Roll. However, he was defeated by Rock, now converted into the combat robot "Mega Man". Wily returned as the antagonist of subsequent titles in the main series with a different scheme each time, sometimes framing someone else for his crimes (Dr. Cossack, Proto Man, a disguise for himself named Mr. X, and Dr. Light), only to be defeated and surrender to Mega Man at the end. Wily is also responsible for the creation of several other characters throughout the series, including Bass and Zero, and is indirectly responsible for the behaviour of the antagonist of the Mega Man X series, Sigma, during that series.

In the separate continuity of the Mega Man Battle Network series, a different version of Wily, dubbed Mr. Wily, served as the primary antagonists in the first, third and sixth games. A former friend of Doctor Tadashi Hikari (the Battle Network version of Doctor Light), he became angered when his research in robotics was pushed aside in favor of Tadashi's research into expansion of the internet. Forming a crime syndicate, Wily sought to destroy Tadashi's work through the use of hacking and computer viruses, coming into direct conflict with Tadashi's grandson Lan Hikari and by extension MegaMan.EXE. However, after several failures, the realization he had been a poor father to his son Dr. Regal, and taking the role of a surrogate father for Baryl, Wily reformed at the conclusion of Mega Man Battle Network 6 and worked alongside Lan's father for the remainder of the series.

Wily appears in the Wily Capsule from Mega Man 7 as an Assist Trophy in the crossover fighting game Super Smash Bros. Ultimate. He is able to be defeated, upon which he will beg for mercy as he always does when defeated in the original games.

Dr. Wily appeared in Dragalia Lost during the Dragalia Lost/Mega Man crossover event “Mega Man Chaos Protocol”. During the event, Dr. Wily went to the Dragalia Lost world and used technology to brainwash the Dragons known as the Greatwyrms, Brunhilda, Mercury, Midgardsomr, Jupiter, and Zodiark. He was also a boss during the event.

In animation
In Captain N: The Game Master, Dr. Wily is a stereotypical mad scientist who appears as a short, beady-eyed, and slightly grizzled old man. In service to Mother Brain (despite very few appearances in the show), Wily manages to be possibly the most competent of Mother Brain's henchmen, regularly using his genius to build powerful robot masters, wild gadgets or develop complicated schemes to defeat the N-Team. He speaks with a German accent, and is constantly wheezing in his speech. Dr. Wily is voiced by Ian James Corlett.

In the Ruby-Spears cartoon, Wily's character and appearance is more in line with the original games, being Light's former assistant before turning against the world. As revealed in the first episode, Wily leaves Light after their test of their prototype humanoid robot failed, believing that Light sabotaged his work to steal all the credit. Wily steals the prototype, then later returns to reprogram Light's robots into his own servants, including the recently built Rock and Roll (though they do manage to escape from Wily), and proceeds with his plans to rule the world with his robots, all of which being inevitably foiled by Mega Man. As in Captain N, Wily speaks with a German accent and is also prone to fits of maniacal laughter. He is voiced by Scott McNeil. Dr. Wily also appears to be more like a normal human in the TV series.

In Mega Man: Fully Charged. A school boy named Bert Wily is Aki Light's best friend. The comic book revival mini-series reveals that Bert is related to the  Fully Charged version of Dr. Wily, who is his grandson. He manipulates Skull Man, the Robot Masters, Mega Man, and Nanagem against each other to create a robot uprising he would control in the shadows. After Skull Man's death and the reconciliation of Mega Man and Nanagem, Dr. Wily reveals he stole the former's schematics and pilots a giant mech to kill them both. He is defeated and begs for mercy before escaping. 

Dr. Wily was set to make a cameo appearance in the 2012 Disney movie, Wreck-It Ralph, as part of the villains' support group Bad-Anon, however, he was cut in the final version of the film.

In print

Archie Comics
In the Archie Comics Mega Man series, Dr. Wily is, as in the games, an old colleague of Dr. Light's, as well as of Dr. Cossack and the comics-exclusive scientist Noele Lalinde. Wily was given a government contract to develop military robots, and creating a massive mobile Weapons platform known as the Wily Walker. However, when he chose to arm it with chemical weapons-supposedly for "demonstration" purposes-his work was seized, his labs shut down, and he was banned from working on advanced robotics. Unfortunately, Wily managed to find a loophole by convincing his old friend Dr. Light to help him participate in the design of the Robot Masters, in particular providing input on the development of Blues. However, Wily eventually became tired of Light receiving all the credit for what he considered their shared work, and decided to demonstrate his genius by reprogramming the first six Robot Masters to attack the city. However, Mega Man managed to defeat them and came to challenge Wily, who was imprisoned but later freed by Time Man and Oil Man of Mega Man Powered Up. When a scheme involving infecting Mega Man with a virus using a second line of Robot Masters was also thwarted, Wily headed to the mysterious Lanfront Ruins, where he came across the alien computer Ra Moon from Super Adventure Rockman. Ra Moon subsequently recreated Wily's first Robot Masters before creating a new set using designs created by Wily and Light and the remains of an alien robot found in the same ruins, creating the units from Mega Man 3. Much to Wily's surprise, his and Light's long-lost creation Blues turned up in the area, and Wily was able to repair his power supply. In gratitude, Blues pledged his loyalty to Wily, adopting the name Break Man as a means of turning his back on his former life.

The Worlds Collide crossover with the Sonic the Hedgehog comic began as a result of Wily's minions locating one of the Chaos Emeralds from Sonic the Hedgehog's reality, which enabled Wily to make contact with Dr. Eggman. Realizing that they had much in common, the two scientists formed an alliance with an eye at reshaping both their universes as they saw fit, including the elimination of their hated rivals. Their plans initially saw success, as they were able to alter their worlds, turn several of Sonic's friends into "Roboticized Masters" who combined both their evil technologies, and trick Sonic and Mega Man into fighting each other. However, once the two heroes realized the error of their ways and joined forces, they made swift headway against Eggman and Wily. The alliance between the pair turned sour after Eggman attempted to kill the imprisoned Dr. Light-something the more moderate Wily did not condone-and they were eventually defeated, with Mega Man restoring his universe to normal. With no memories of ever contacting Eggman, Wily prepared to embark on his next plan, only to have Ra Moon betray him and blanket the world in an electromagnetic field that shut down all unprotected machinery. Wily's second line of Robot Masters fell under Ra Moon's control, as did the Ra Thor robot Wily built with Ra Moon's technology in an effort to destroy it. However, Break Man and his first line of Masters remained loyal to him, and teamed with the arriving Mega Man to battle Ra Moon's forces, which led to Ra Moon's destruction.

With his plans for Ra Moon shattered, Wily laid the groundwork for another plan involving his forces of Robot Masters. Returning to Dr. Light with the damaged Mega Man, he helped repair the heroic robot and made the pretense of wishing to reform, and was actually tempted to do so for a time due to Light's warmth in welcoming him back. However, he decided to continue his schemes, having his second line of Robot Masters steal the power sources for Dr. Light's Gamma robot and using them to lure Mega Man away. He also tricked Mega Man and several other Robot Masters into going to his old lab where the Wily Walker remained in storage, and tricked them into activating it in a failed attempt to destroy them.  He and Dr. Light also created Doc Robot, which Wily secretly planned to use to destroy Mega Man.  During the comics' Mega Man 3 adaptation, Wily, with Break Man's help, finally revealed his deception, stole Gamma, and destroyed Light Labs before escaping to a new Wily Castle to gain full control of Gamma.  Before he could do so, Mega Man tracked him down and defeated him once again after being tipped off by Break Man, who then rescued Mega Man while Wily was seemingly killed.

A mysterious group later retrieved badly injured Wily on behalf of "Mr. X", under whose employ Wily was abducted by Sigma from Mega Man X, leading to the second Sonic/Mega Man crossover, Worlds Unite.  Brought to the Lost Hex on Sonic's world, he found himself reunited with Eggman, from whom he learned about their prior partnership, although Eggman lied about his attempt to kill Dr. Light.  Reconciled, the doctors persuaded Sigma to capture Sonic and Mega Man, whom they transformed into evil versions of themselves (dubbed "Sonic Man" and "M'egga Man") while secretly programming them to revert each other and set them on Sigma; this would allow them to take over his plans, which involved absorbing energy from different worlds using machines called Unity Engines.  However, the intended reversion happened too soon, exposing the doctors' treachery and forcing them to team up with anti-robotics terrorist Xander Payne and an army of Sega/Capcom heroes led by Sonic and Mega Man.  During a battle between the heroes and Sigma's forces, the doctors eventually infiltrated the Lost Hex with Payne's help and prepared to claim the energy that the Unity Engines had harvested, cutting off Sigma's power supply in the process and allowing Sonic and Mega Man to defeat him.  However, Payne ultimately betrayed the doctors and altered time to prevent the crossover from occurring, although Wily (along with Eggman, Mega Man, and Sonic) retained some recollection of the ordeal.  Thwarted again, Wily, after realizing that Mr. X was actually Payne, unhappily went back to the old drawing board.  This led to the comics' Mega Man 4 adaptation, in which Wily planned revenge on Dr. Cossack, another one of Light's colleagues, and had Break Man capture Cossack's daughter Kalinka to use as leverage.  The series went on hiatus after this, ending the story on a cliffhanger.

Promotion and reception
Wily has been noted as a popular character and villain, and has been compared to similar characters such as Doctor Robotnik. From 1991 to 1994, Nintendo Power consecutively named him one of the best villains in video games to appear on Nintendo-produced consoles in their annual Nintendo Power awards, describing him as "one of the most beloved mad scientists". He would later appear in their January 2010 issue, ranking in as their fourth best villain in Nintendo history. They also ranked him as having one of the best mustaches. He placed thirty-ninth in GamePro's "47 Most Diabolical Video-Game Villains of All Time" article, noting him to be "[c]learly a standout from the overcrowded school of mad scientists". Guinness World Records Gamer's Edition listed Dr. Wily as 27th in their list of top 50 Villains. In a "Reader's Choice" edition of GameSpot's "Top Ten Video Game Villains" article, Wily placed fifth, and while noted as not receiving enough votes to place above Doctor Eggman on the list, the character came close. Dr. Wily ranked sixth on IGN's Top 10 Video Game Characters who should die along with his nemesis, Dr. Light. IGN editor Colin Moriarty stated that while their rivalry may have been fascinating for over 20 years, they need to go so the core series may advance. GamesRadar staff described Dr. Wily as one of the best villains in video games, stating that "Mad scientists are pretty standard fare, but Dr. Wily brings a certain flair to his evil schemes." 

Computerworld named Wily as one of gaming's "baddest villains", praising his persistence despite his failure at the conclusion of each Mega Man game. 1UP.com editor Jeremy Parish shared the sentiment, stating "the fact that his schemes ultimately boil down to creating eight themed robots with a fatal weakness to one another's powers casts his 'genius' descriptor into doubt. Still, you have to admire his persistence." GameDaily named him one of their favorite older characters in video games and one of the "Top 25 Evil Masterminds of All Time", ranking him second on their list while stating "using good robots to do bad things is sheer genius." They additionally cited his rivalry with Mega Man as one of the ten greatest in video games, describing it as one "still going strong to this day." In a later article, they listed the "evil mastermind" as one of their top 25 video game archetypes, using Wily as an example. IGN listed him as the 13th Best Video Game Villain, calling him one of the most "hopelessly persistent" video game villains.

References

Capcom antagonists
Fictional physicians
Fictional mechanics
Fictional outlaws
Fictional roboticists
Fictional inventors in video games
Mad scientist characters in video games
Male characters in video games
Male video game villains
Mega Man characters
Video game characters based on real people
Video game bosses
Video game characters introduced in 1987